Regina–Qu'Appelle (formerly Qu'Appelle) is a federal electoral district in Saskatchewan, Canada, that has been represented in the House of Commons of Canada from 1904 to 1968 and since 1988.

Geography
The district includes the northeastern quarter of the city of Regina and the surrounding eastern rural area including the towns of Balgonie, Fort Qu'Appelle, Indian Head, Qu'Appelle, Pilot Butte, and White City; extending northwards to the towns of Southey, Cupar, Raymore, Punnichy, and Wynyard.

Demographics
According to the Canada 2011 Census; 2013 representation

Ethnic groups: 72.5% White, 21.7% Aboriginal, 1.2% South Asian, 1.0% Black, 1.0% Filipino 
Languages: 91.0% English, 1.3% Ukrainian, 1.2% German, 1.0% French 
Religions: 67.2% Christian (28.8% Catholic, 11.9% United Church, 7.9% Lutheran, 4.0% Anglican, 1.3% Baptist, 1.3% Pentecostal, 12.0% Other), 3.6% Traditional Aboriginal Spirituality, 1.1% Muslim, 26.9% No religion 
Median income (2010): $29,627 
Average income (2010): $37,401

History
The Qu'Appelle riding was first created in 1903 and covered the Northwest Territories, including what would later be Saskatchewan. In 1905, the district was amended to just cover Saskatchewan.

In 1966, Qu'Appelle riding was abolished when it was redistributed between the Qu'Appelle—Moose Mountain, Regina—Lake Centre, Regina East and Assiniboia ridings.

In 1987, Regina—Qu'Appelle was created from parts of the Assiniboia, Humboldt—Lake Centre, Qu'Appelle–Moose Mountain and Regina East ridings.

The riding was known as Qu'Appelle from 1996 to 1998. In 1998, its name was changed back to Regina—Qu'Appelle.

This riding gained fractions of territory from Palliser, Regina—Lumsden—Lake Centre and Blackstrap during the 2012 electoral redistribution. It became the only hybrid urban-rural riding in the Regina area after the 2012 redistribution.

Members of Parliament

The riding has elected the following members of the House of Commons:

Current member of Parliament
Its Member of Parliament is Andrew Scheer, the former leader of the Conservative Party of Canada and Leader of the Official Opposition. Formerly in the insurance industry, he served in the 41st Canadian Parliament as Speaker of the House of Commons. He was first elected in the 2004 election. In a previous parliamentary session he served as a member on the Standing Committee on Transport and the Standing Committee on Official Languages.

Election results

Regina—Qu'Appelle

Qu'Appelle, 1988–2000

Qu'Appelle, 1904–1968

See also
 List of Canadian federal electoral districts
 Past Canadian electoral districts

References

Notes

External links
 
 
 
 
 
 Expenditures - 2008
 Expenditures - 2004
 Expenditures - 2000
 Expenditures - 1997

Politics of Regina, Saskatchewan
Saskatchewan federal electoral districts
Former federal electoral districts of Northwest Territories